Kurilpa may refer to
 Electoral district of Kurilpa, a former electoral district in Queensland, Australia
 West End, Queensland, a locality known to its indigenous inhabitants as "Kurilpa"
 The Fawn-footed mosaic-tailed rat, a native Australian rodent

See also
 Kurilpa Bridge
 Kurilpa Library